The Pakistan Army Air Defence Corps,, abbreviated as ADC), is an military administrative formation of the Pakistan Army, tasked with preparing its constituent units for anti-aircraft warfare against foreign threats. The Corps should not be confused with the Army Air Defence Command, which is a deployment formation that includes some of the regiments of the Corps.

The Corps was formed in 1989 following military exercises where Pakistan's military learned of its weakness in providing air cover over a moving battlefield. It consists of twelve regiments together with the School of Army Air Defence (SAAD).

Units 
 67 Light Air Defence (SP) Regiment
 74 Light Air Defence (SAM) Regiment
 89 Light Air Defence Regiment
 97 RCG Air Defence Regiment
 98 RCG Air Defence Regiment
 102 Light Air Defence (SAM) Regiment
 103 Light Air Defence (GM) Regiment
 104 RCG Air Defence Regiment
 126 Light Air Defence (Gun Missile) Regiment
 127 Medium Air Defence Regiment
 134 Radar Control Guns Regiment
 146 Light Air Defence Regiment
 148 Light Air Defence (SP) Regiment
 151 Light Air Defence (SP) Regiment
 153 Light Air Defence (SP) Regiment
 154 Light Air Defence (SP) Regiment
 160 RCG Air Defence Regiment

Key
 RCG = Radar Control Guns
 SAM = Surface to Air Missile
 SP = Self Propelled

List of commanders

References

External links 
Army Air Defence (Official)
GlobalSecurity.org, Global Security Website about the Army Air Defence

A
Air defence units and formations
Military units and formations established in 1989